Pulkovo may refer to:

Pulkovo Heights marking the southern limit of Saint Petersburg, Russia
Pulkovo Airport serving Saint Petersburg, Russia
Pulkovo Aviation Enterprise, a former (until 2006) state airline based in Saint Petersburg, Russia
Pulkovo Observatory, The Central Astronomical Observatory of the Russian Academy of Sciences at Pulkovo, 19 km south of Saint Petersburg